Toom may refer to:

 Toom (surname)
 Toom (Netherlands), a hamlet
 Toom (supermarket), a chain of supermarkets in Germany; see Minimal (supermarket)
 Toum, a garlic sauce from Lebanon (alternative spelling)
 Time Out of Mind (Bob Dylan album), 1997